The Last Whale is a 2008 book by Chris Pash, an Australian author and journalist. It is about the end of whaling in Australia including the closure of the last Australian whaling company, Cheynes Beach Whaling Company.

Reception
The Last Whale has been reviewed by the Journal of Commonwealth Literature, and The Sydney Morning Herald.

It was shortlisted for the 2009 Frank Broeze Memorial Maritime History Book Prize.

See also
Whaling in Western Australia

References

External links
Library holdings of The Last Whale
 IPA Review article on whaling that summarises The Last Whale

2008 non-fiction books
Australian non-fiction books
Albany, Western Australia
Whaling in Australia
Books about whaling
Fremantle Press books